Clarence Isaiah Pontius (1892–1981), more commonly identified as Clarence I. Pontius, C. I. Pontius or Cy Pontius, was an Oklahoma businessman, banker and university president. Pontius was born in Butler County, Pennsylvania. He then enrolled in Ohio State University, graduating in 1915 with a degree in agriculture. Following graduation, he built a career in business and finance in Ohio. He relocated to Tulsa, Oklahoma, where he continued his career in finance. In 1935, the trustees of Tulsa University, then struggling with financial problems caused by the Great Depression, recruited Pontius to serve as president of the school. He remained in that position until he retired in 1958 and continued to serve as chancellor until 1964.

Career

Businessman in Ohio 
Pontius established himself in Warren, Ohio, where he spent the next 15 years organizing financial companies. For fourteen years, he was the executive officer of the Trumbull National Farm Loan Association, which was connected with the regional Federal Land Bank in Louisville, Kentucky. In 1920, while remaining with Trumbull, he organized Valley City Mortgage and Loan Company, and served as treasurer, manager and president until 1930.

Businessman in Oklahoma 
During the Texas oil boom, Pontius moved to the then-Oil Capital of the World, Tulsa, in 1930, where he became a successful investment banker. He then organized Public Securities Corporation of Tulsa, becoming its president in 1932.

University president in Oklahoma 
In mid-1935, Tulsa University (TU) expressed their interest in having him become its president, explaining that TU was facing dire financial straits that threatened its very existence and that someone was needed at the helm to put the school on a sound footing.

Pontius served 23 years as president until 1958, then became chancellor until 1963. He is credited with saving the school from bankruptcy and putting it on a sound financial basis, and was the longest-serving president in TU's history.

Personal and family life 
Pontius married Ruth Elizabeth Birch of Springfield, Ohio in 1922. She was the daughter of T. Bruce Birch, a professor of philosophy at Wittenberg College in Springfield. The Pontiuses had two children.
Pontius died in Tulsa on December 18, 1981, and was buried in Tulsa's Rose Hill Memorial Park.

Retirement 
In November 1957, the Board of Trustees established a mandatory retirement age of 70 for administrators and established the office of chancellor, which did not specify a retirement age.  He became president emeritus on July 1, 1958. He would remain until 1964.

Tulsa University's growth had been substantial during his presidential administration: between 1935 and 1958, TU's student body had more than quintupled, faculty and staff had grown sixfold and university assets increased more than sevenfold.

Civic activities in Tulsa 
Pontius involved himself in many civic activities. He served on the Tulsa Chamber of Commerce board of directors, and was on the board of directors of the Tulsa-based International Petroleum Exposition. He was appointed to the original Oklahoma State Coordinating Board for Higher Education and the committee which created the Board of Regents for Higher Education. He also was vice president of the Oklahoma Industrial College Foundation and on the board Oklahoma Frontiers of Science.

Awards and Honors 
  Oklahoma City University warded Pontius an honorary Doctor of Laws degree in 1936.
  Oklahoma Governor’s Award for Outstanding Public Service (1942).
  Tulsa’s Man of the Year (1949). 
  Admitted to the Oklahoma Hall of Fame (1951)
  TU Awarded Pontius an honorary Doctor of Humanities degree in 1960.

See also 
 Northfield Mount Hermon School
 University of Tulsa

Notes

References 

1892 births
1981 deaths
People from Butler County, Pennsylvania
People from Warren, Ohio
People from Tulsa, Oklahoma
Ohio State University alumni
Businesspeople from Tulsa, Oklahoma
Presidents of the University of Tulsa